Sarhad may refer to:

People
Sarhad Khan, Mughal general

Places
 Sar Hadd, in Iran
 Sarhad District, in Iran
 Sarhad Province, old name of Khyber Pakhtunkhwa Province in Pakistan
 Sarhad, Sindh, a town in Sindh, Pakistan
 Sarhad, Badakhshan, a village in Badakhshan district, Afghanistan

Films
 Sarhad: The Border of Crime, a 1995 Hindi film
 Sarhad (unreleased film), an unreleased Indian film produced in 1976